The 2011–12 UEFA Champions League was the 57th season of Europe's premier club football tournament organised by UEFA, and the 20th season in its current Champions League format. As part of a trial that started in the 2009–10 UEFA Europa League, two extra officials – one behind each goal – were used in all matches of the competition from the play-off round.

The final was held at the Allianz Arena in Munich, Germany. Chelsea's caretaker manager Roberto Di Matteo led the club to win their first Champions League title after beating Bayern Munich 4–3 on penalties in the final. As tenants of the Allianz Arena (known as Fußball Arena München for the final), this meant that Bayern were the first finalists to have home advantage since 1984. By winning the tournament, Chelsea earned a berth at the 2012 FIFA Club World Cup and 2012 UEFA Super Cup. Barcelona were the defending champions, but were eliminated by the eventual winners Chelsea in the semi-finals.

Association team allocation
A total of 76 teams participated in the 2011–12 Champions League from 52 UEFA associations (Liechtenstein organises no domestic league competition). Associations are allocated places according to their 2010 UEFA country coefficients, which takes into account their performance in European competitions from 2005–06 to 2009–10.

Below is the qualification scheme for the 2011–12 UEFA Champions League:
Associations 1–3 each have four teams qualify
Associations 4–6 each have three teams qualify
Associations 7–15 each have two teams qualify
Associations 16–53 each have one team qualify (excluding Liechtenstein)

Association ranking

Distribution
Since the winners of the 2010–11 UEFA Champions League, Barcelona, obtained a place in the group stage through their domestic league placing, the reserved title holder spot in the group stage was effectively vacated. To compensate:
 The champions of association 13 (Switzerland) were promoted from the third qualifying round to the group stage.
 The champions of association 16 (Scotland) were promoted from the second qualifying round to the third qualifying round.
 The champions of associations 48 and 49 (Faroe Islands and Northern Ireland) were promoted from the first qualifying round to the second qualifying round.

Teams
League positions of the previous season shown in parentheses.

Notes
th Title Holder
Romania (ROU): Because Politehnica Timișoara, the 2010–11 Liga I runners-up, were denied a domestic licence for the 2011–12 season, Vaslui, the third-placed team of the league, claimed the Champions League spot in the third qualifying round League Route.
Turkey (TUR): Fenerbahçe, the 2010–11 Süper Lig champions, was banned by the Turkish Football Federation on 24 August 2011 from participating in the 2011–12 UEFA Champions League due to the ongoing investigation into match-fixing. UEFA decided to replace them in the group stage with Trabzonspor, the league runners-up, who had lost in the Champions League third qualifying round and were participating in the Europa League play-off round at that time.

Round and draw dates
All draws held at UEFA headquarters in Nyon, Switzerland unless stated otherwise.

Qualifying rounds

In the qualifying rounds and the play-off round, teams were divided into seeded and unseeded teams based on their 2011 UEFA club coefficients, and then drawn into two-legged home-and-away ties. Teams from the same association cannot be drawn against each other.

First qualifying round
The draw for the first and second qualifying rounds was held on 20 June 2011. The first legs were played on 28 June, and the second legs were played on 5 and 6 July 2011.

Second qualifying round
The first legs were played on 12 and 13 July, and the second legs were played on 19 and 20 July 2011.

HJK's 10–0 win over Bangor City in the second leg broke the record for the largest margin of victory in the largest margin of victory in the current Champions League format.

Third qualifying round
The draw for the third qualifying round was held on 15 July 2011. The first legs were played on 26 and 27 July, and the second legs were played on 2 and 3 August 2011.

The third qualifying round was split into two separate sections: one for champions (called the Champions Route) and one for non-champions (called the League Route). The losing teams in both sections entered the play-off round of the 2011–12 UEFA Europa League.

Play-off round

The draw for the play-off round was held on 5 August 2011. The first legs were played on 16 and 17 August, and the second legs were played on 23 and 24 August 2011.

The play-off round was split into two separate sections: one for champions (called the Champions Route) and one for non-champions (called the League Route). The losing teams in both sections entered the group stage of the 2011–12 UEFA Europa League.

Group stage

The group stage features 32 teams, which were allocated into pots based on their 2011 UEFA club coefficients (except the title holders, Barcelona, who were placed in Pot 1 automatically), and then drawn into eight groups of four. Teams from the same association cannot be drawn against each other. The draw was held on 25 August 2011 in Monaco.

In each group, teams play against each other home-and-away in a round-robin format. The matchdays are 13–14 September, 27–28 September, 18–19 October, 1–2 November, 22–23 November, and 6–7 December 2011. The group winners and runners-up advanced to the round of 16, while the third-placed teams entered the round of 32 of the 2011–12 UEFA Europa League.

If two or more teams are equal on points on completion of the group matches, the following criteria are applied to determine the rankings (in descending order):
higher number of points obtained in the group matches played among the teams in question;
superior goal difference from the group matches played among the teams in question;
higher number of goals scored in the group matches played among the teams in question;
higher number of goals scored away from home in the group matches played among the teams in question;
If, after applying criteria 1) to 4) to several teams, two teams still have an equal ranking, the criteria 1) to 4) will be reapplied to determine the ranking of these teams;
superior goal difference from all group matches played;
higher number of goals scored from all group matches played;
higher number of coefficient points accumulated by the club in question, as well as its association, over the previous five seasons.

The 32 teams comprise 11 former winners of the European Cup/Champions League (40 titles combined), and five teams (Manchester City, Napoli, Trabzonspor, Viktoria Plzeň and Oțelul Galați) making their debut appearance in the group stage. Eighteen UEFA member associations are represented in this group stage: England and Spain by four clubs, Italy, Germany and France by three, Russia and Portugal by two, while eleven associations are represented by one club, which are all domestic champions except Trabzonspor, which replaced Fenerbahçe due to match-fixing allegations.

Group A

Group B

Group C

Group D

Group E

Group F

Group G

Group H

Knockout phase

In the knockout phase, teams play against each other over two legs on a home-and-away basis, except for the one-match final. The draw for the round of 16 was held on 16 December 2011. The draws for the quarter-finals, semi-finals and final (to determine the "home" team) were held on 16 March 2012. Both draws were assisted by German footballer Paul Breitner, the ambassador for the 2012 final.

In the draw for the round of 16, the eight group winners were seeded, and the eight group runners-up were unseeded. The seeded teams were drawn against the unseeded teams, with the seeded team hosting the second leg. Teams from the same group or the same association could not be drawn against each other. In the draws for the quarter-finals onwards, there are no seedings, and teams from the same group or the same association may be drawn with each other.

Bracket

Round of 16
The first legs were played on 14, 15, 21 and 22 February, and the second legs were played on 6, 7, 13 and 14 March 2012.

|}

Quarter-finals
The first legs were played on 27 and 28 March, and the second legs were played on 3 and 4 April 2012.

|}

Semi-finals
The first legs were played on 17 and 18 April, and the second legs were played on 24 and 25 April 2012.

|}

Final

The final was played on 19 May 2012 at the Allianz Arena in Munich, Germany.

Statistics
Statistics exclude qualifying rounds and play-off round.

Top goalscorers

Source:

Top assists

Source:

See also
 2011–12 UEFA Europa League
 2012 FIFA Club World Cup
 2012 UEFA Super Cup
 2011–12 UEFA Women's Champions League

References

External links

2011–12 All matches – season at UEFA website
2011–12 UEFA Champions League, UEFA.com
All scorers 2011–12 UEFA Champions League (excluding qualifying round) according to protocols UEFA + all scorers qualifying round
2011/12 UEFA Champions League – results and line-ups (archive)

 
1
UEFA Champions League seasons